Yelü Shuge was a Liao dynasty imperial princess. She was the fourth daughter of Emperor Jingzong of Liao and Consort of Bohai. She firstly married Lu Jun (卢俊) in 980 (2nd year of the Qianheng era) from the Northern Han dynasty. However, in 983 (1st year of the Tonghe era), their odds were against each other and wanted to divorce. Then in October of the same year, she remarried again with Xiao Shennu (萧神奴).

References

Year of birth unknown
Liao dynasty people
Year of death unknown
Yelü clan
10th-century Khitan women